Gibloux Radio Tower is built on the 1204 metre Gibloux mountain above Sorens, west of Fribourg, Switzerland.

References

Towers completed in 1994
Fribourg
Towers in Switzerland
Buildings and structures in the canton of Fribourg
1994 establishments in Switzerland
20th-century architecture in Switzerland